Marek Posmyk (born September 15, 1978) is a Czech professional ice hockey defenceman currently playing for HC České Budějovice previously for HC Plzeň in the Czech Extraliga.  He was drafted in the second round, 36th overall, of the 1996 NHL Entry Draft by the Toronto Maple Leafs.  He was traded by the Maple Leafs to the Tampa Bay Lightning on February 9, 2000, as part of the deal which brought Darcy Tucker to Toronto.

Posmyk played nineteen games in the National Hockey League with the Lightning: eighteen in the 1999–2000 season and one more in the 2000–01 season.  He scored one goal and two assists for Tampa Bay.

Career statistics

Regular season and playoffs

External links 
 

1978 births
Living people
Czech ice hockey defencemen
Detroit Vipers players
Nürnberg Ice Tigers players
Sportspeople from Jihlava
St. John's Maple Leafs players
Sarnia Sting players
Tampa Bay Lightning players
Toronto Maple Leafs draft picks
Czech expatriate ice hockey players in Canada
Czech expatriate ice hockey players in the United States
Czech expatriate ice hockey players in Germany
Czech expatriate sportspeople in Italy
Expatriate ice hockey players in Italy